Lunca Largă may refer to several villages in Romania:

 Lunca Largă, a village in Bistra, Alba Commune, Alba County
 Lunca Largă, a village in Ocoliș Commune, Alba County